Steven ("Steve") John Barry (born 25 October 1950) is a retired Welsh race walker, born in Cardiff.

A member of the Cardiff Amateur Athletic Club and Roath Walking Club, Barry won the gold medal in the 30 km road walk at the 1982 Commonwealth Games representing Wales.

Barry represented Great Britain at the 1984 Los Angeles Olympics in the 20 km walk, finishing 24th. Barry retired from the sport through injury following the Olympics.

Barry won the BBC Wales Sports Personality of the Year in 1982.

International competitions

References

1950 births
Living people
Sportspeople from Cardiff
Welsh racewalkers
British male racewalkers
Olympic athletes of Great Britain
Athletes (track and field) at the 1984 Summer Olympics
Commonwealth Games gold medallists for Wales
Commonwealth Games medallists in athletics
Athletes (track and field) at the 1982 Commonwealth Games
Medallists at the 1982 Commonwealth Games